Umzimvubu Local Municipality is an administrative area in the Alfred Nzo District of Eastern Cape in South Africa.

Umzimvubu, the name of the Mzimvubu River is an isiXhosa name which means "home of the hippopotamus". Umzimvubu Local Municipality falls within the Alfred Nzo District of the Eastern Cape Province. The Municipal area comprises an area of 2506 square kilometres.
 
The municipality has undergone a number of amendments in terms of municipal and ward demarcation which has a profound impact on planning in the area.

Main places
The 2001 census divided the municipality into the following main places:

Politics 

The municipal council consists of fifty-five members elected by mixed-member proportional representation. Twenty-eight councillors are elected by first-past-the-post voting in twenty-eight wards, while the remaining twenty-seven are chosen from party lists so that the total number of party representatives is proportional to the number of votes received. In the election of 1 November 2021 the African National Congress (ANC) won a majority of forty-two seats on the council.
The following table shows the results of the election.

References

External links
 http://www.umzimvubu.gov.za

Local municipalities of the Alfred Nzo District Municipality